Sekolah Menengah Kebangsaan Kompleks KLIA is a secondary school located in the residential area of Kuala Lumpur International Airport, Malaysia. The school is located in the Kuarters KLIA residency and is situated beside the SKKKLIA building.

Facilities 
Some of the facilities provided are:
 Tennis Court
 Volley Ball Court 
 Badminton Court
 Hockey Ring
 Soccer Field 
 Language Lab
 MPV Room
 Chemistry Lab 
 Assembly Field
 School Hall
 Physic Lab
 Biology Lab
 Science Lab 
 Library 
 Morning Radio
 Cafeteria (serving 3-star cuisines)
 Muslim Surau
 Wood, Pipe, Cooking, Sewing, Electronic Workshops
 Counselling Offices

Seremban District
Schools in Negeri Sembilan
Secondary schools in Malaysia